LaSalle Thompson III (born June 23, 1961) is an American former professional basketball player, who spent most of his 15-year career with the Kansas City/Sacramento Kings and Indiana Pacers.  The 6 ft 10 in, 245-pound Thompson spent time at both the center and power forward positions during his playing career. He later served as an assistant coach for the Charlotte Bobcats, during head coach Larry Brown's tenure and for the New York Knicks during head coach Mike Woodson's tenure.

Playing career

College 
Nicknamed "Tank", Thompson finished his career at Texas as the school's all-time leader in rebounds with 1,027, despite the fact he played only three years. The record would stand for 21 years until it was broken by James Thomas in 2004.

Kansas City/Sacramento Kings 
Thompson was drafted by the Kings with the fifth overall pick in the 1982 NBA draft, making him the highest Texas player taken until LaMarcus Aldridge was selected second overall in 2006. During the 1984 NBA playoffs, Thompson averaged what would be postseason career-highs of 15 points and 10 rebounds per game, during a first round loss against the Los Angeles Lakers.

In 1989–1990, he averaged 13.9 points and 9.4 rebounds per game while spending a half-season in Sacramento and the other half in Indiana. That season, while still on the Kings, Thompson scored a career-high 31 points during a 147-142 loss to the Portland Trail Blazers.

Indiana Pacers 
A regular starter for most of the first part of his career, in 1992–1993 Thompson moved to a role as the tough-nosed veteran off the bench, as Rik Smits and Dale Davis started every game in which they played. Thompson was a key reserve on the first Pacers team to reach the Eastern Conference Finals series, in 1993–1994.

Philadelphia 76ers and Denver Nuggets 
After the 1994–1995 season, Thompson signed with the Philadelphia 76ers, playing there for a year before going to the Denver Nuggets.

Return to the Pacers 
He ended his career with nine more games in a Pacers uniform, following the trade-deadline deal that also brought Mark Jackson back to Indiana.

Post-NBA career
Thompson served a stint as general manager and head coach of the San Diego Wildfire in the American Basketball Association in the 2000–01 season, which would be the only season of the Wildfire's existence.

He is co-owner of Prime Time Motors, an automobile sales firm in California.

On May 30, 2008, Thompson accepted an offer from Larry Brown (for whom he played during his stints with Indiana Pacers) and the Charlotte Bobcats to become an assistant coach  where he worked until Larry Brown parted ways with the Bobcats after the team started the season 9-19 on December 22, 2010.

Before the start of 2012–13 NBA season, Thompson became assistant coach of the New York Knicks under Mike Woodson (with whom he played for Kings in Kansas City and Sacramento) replacing Kenny Atkinson who quit joining the Atlanta Hawks staff. He worked for Knicks for 2 seasons until Woodson was fired on April 21, 2014.

Has one son, Nickolas who plays basketball at Jonesboro High School in Jonesboro, Arkansas, and one daughter (Ruby) who plays volleyball for Evanston Township High School in Evanston, Illinois, and club at Sports Performance Volleyball Club.

See also
List of NCAA Division I men's basketball season rebounding leaders

References

External links
LaSalle Thompson Bio at Basketball-Reference.com

1961 births
Living people
African-American basketball players
American men's basketball players
American strength and conditioning coaches
Basketball coaches from Ohio
Basketball players from Cincinnati
Centers (basketball)
Charlotte Bobcats assistant coaches
Denver Nuggets players
Indiana Pacers players
Kansas City Kings draft picks
Kansas City Kings players
New York Knicks assistant coaches
Philadelphia 76ers players
Sacramento Kings players
Texas Longhorns men's basketball players
21st-century African-American people
20th-century African-American sportspeople